Madeleine Bertine Hicklin (born 3 September 1957) is a South African politician who has served as a Member of the National Assembly since May 2019. She served as a ward councillor in the City of Johannesburg Metropolitan Municipality from August 2016 to May 2019. Hicklin is a member of the Democratic Alliance.

Politics
Hicklin joined the Democratic Alliance and was elected as the ward councillor for ward 112 of the City of Johannesburg Metropolitan Municipality in the 2016 municipal election.

Parliamentary career
Hicklin was nominated to the National Assembly following the general election that was held on 8 May 2019. She was sworn in as an MP on 22 May 2019. On 27 June 2019, she was given her committee assignment.

On 5 December 2020, Hicklin was appointed as Shadow Deputy Minister of Public Works and Infrastructure, succeeding Samantha Graham, who became shadow minister.

Committee membership
 Portfolio Committee on Public Works and Infrastructure (Alternate Member)

Personal life
Hicklin is a niece of the late anti-apartheid activist Denis Goldberg. She is also Jewish.

References

External links
Mrs Madeleine Bertine Hicklin at Parliament of South Africa

Living people
1957 births
Democratic Alliance (South Africa) politicians
21st-century South African politicians
21st-century South African women politicians
Members of the National Assembly of South Africa
People from Johannesburg
Jewish South African politicians